WWDW is an adult hits formatted broadcast radio station licensed to Alberta, Virginia, serving the Southside.  WWDW is owned and operated by John Byrne, through licensee Byrne Acquisition Group, LLC.  The station brands itself as "107.7 The Lake".

History
In 2007, a construction permit was granted to Joyner radio for a station on 103.1 in Garysburg, NC (now granted call letters WLQC and relocated to Sharpsburg).  Part of the requirement of utilizing this allocation was to move WWDW from 103.1 to 107.7.  This move took place around April 1, 2009, though no construction permit had been granted or even applied for.

WWDW had to move off 103.1 regardless of the Sharpsburg allocation, as 103.1's second harmonic happens to be the same frequency as that used by WWBT channel 12 in Richmond. This means that when WWDW is on the air, television viewers experience interference on channel 12. This has kept WWDW off the air for extended periods of time. 

On October 25, 2017, WWDW changed their format from adult contemporary to variety hits, branded as "107.7 The Lake". On January 2, 2019, the format changed once again, this time to classic rock and a new branding, "107.7 Rock City". In addition, WWDW also picked up Two Guys Named Chris, a syndicated program based out of WKRR in Greensboro, North Carolina.

Previous logo

References

External links

WDW
Radio stations established in 2001